Spelaeodiscus triarius is a species of very small air-breathing land snail, a terrestrial pulmonate gastropod mollusk in the family Spelaeodiscidae.

Subspecies 
 Spelaeodiscus triarius tatricus (Hazay, 1883) - synonym: Spelaeodiscus tatricus Hazay, 1883 - The native distribution of this subspecies is western-carpathian. It is endemic to Slovakia and it is listed as Vulnerable in the 2010 IUCN Red List.

References

External links
 Animal base info on this species

Spelaeodiscidae
Gastropods described in 1839
Taxonomy articles created by Polbot